The following is a timeline of the history of New Bedford, Massachusetts, United States.

Prior to 19th century
 1602 - Bartholomew Gosnold an English privateer visits the site of New Bedford.
 1652 - European settlers arrive.
 ca.1665 - Influx of Quakers.
 1760 - Village proper established.
 1778 - September - Grey's raid by the British against American coastal communities.
 1787 - Town incorporated.
 1792
 The Medley newspaper begins publication.
 Post office in operation.
 1796 - New Bedford and Fairhaven Bridge Company incorporated.
 1797
 first Clarks Point Light built.
 Population: 3,313.
 1798 - Columbian Courier newspaper begins publication.

19th century
 1800 - Population: 4,361.
 1803 - Social Library organized.
 1804 - 59 whaling vessels were registered from New Bedford.
 1807 - New-Bedford Mercury newspaper begins publication.
 1808 - Old Colony Gazette begins publication.
 1812
 Fairhaven separates from New Bedford.
 Friends' Academy incorporated.

 1816 - Bedford Commercial Bank incorporated.
 1822 - New Bedford Meeting House built.
 1825 - Merchants Bank incorporated.
 1828 - Lyceum founded.
 1829
 Ash Street Jail built.
 First Baptist Church built.
 late 1820's - Abolitionism in New Bedford, Massachusetts voiced by Quakers.
 1830
 New Bedford Port Society formed.
 Population: 7,592.
 1831
 New-Bedford Weekly Register begins publication.
 Dorcas Society organized.
 1832 - Seamen's Bethel built.
 1833 - Mechanics Association founded.
 1834 - United States Customhouse and Rotch house (residence) built.
 1837 - New Bedford Rural Cemetery incorporated.
 1838
 September: Frederick Douglass moves to New Bedford.
 New Bedford and Taunton Rail Road incorporated.
 1840 - Population: 12,087.
 1841 - Charles W. Morgan (ship) built.
 1843
 Whalemen's Shipping List, and Merchant's Transcript begins publication.
 Orphans Home incorporated.
 1846 - Wamsutta Mills incorporated.
 1847
 City incorporated.
 Abraham H. Howland becomes mayor.
 Horticultural Society incorporated.
 Joseph Grinnell built the first cotton mill.
 1848 - Beginning of Arctic Whaling.
 1849
 J. & W. R. Wing Company in business.
 Palmer Island Light built.
 1850
 Daily Evening Standard newspaper begins publication.
 Population: 16,443.
 1853
 Rodney French becomes 3rd Mayor of New Bedford.
 Municipal public library established.
 New Bedford Institute for Savings built.
 1855 - New Bedford Five Cents Savings Bank incorporated.
 1861 - Fort Rodman aka Fort Taber, built at Clark's Point.
 1866

 Hathaway & Soule in business.
 Wamsutta Club founded.
 Hutchinson's Circulating Library in business.
 1867 - Fire Station no.4 built, now houses New Bedford Fire Museum.
 1871
 St. John the Baptist Church founded.
 Whaling Disaster of 1871
 1877 - Church of the Sacred Heart built.
 1884 - St. Luke's Hospital founded.
 1888 - Fairhaven Bridge Light built.
 1890 - Population: 40,733.
 1891 - Charles S. Ashley becomes mayor.
 1892 - Club of French Sharpshooters, a benevolent and fraternal organization founded by 80 French Canadian residents of the North End, founded.
 1894 - Buttonwood Park Zoo opens.
 1895
 St. Anthony of Padua Church founded.
 New Bedford Textile School founded.
 1899
 New Bedford – Fairhaven Bridge constructed.
 Union Baptist Church built.
 1900 - Population: 62,442.

20th century

 1901 - Hotel Waverly built.
 1903
 Old Dartmouth Historical Society founded.
 New Bedford Whaling Museum established.
 Insect invasion.
 1905 - Our Lady of Perpetual Help Parish established.
 1906 - Completion of harbour improvements.
 1908 - St. Anthony of Padua Church built.
 1910
 Population: 96,652.
 Local 147 of the National Industrial Union of Textile Workers (IWW) declares a strike against increases in work.
 1912 - Orpheum Theatre opens.
 1916 - Whaling Museum opens.
 1919 - Alvorada Jornal Diario newspaper begins publication.
 1920 - Population: 121,217.
 1923
 April 2: The Zeiterion theatre opens
 1927 - St. Casimir Parish established.
 1942 - Airport built.
 1946 - Your Theatre founded.
 1958 - Northeast Airlines Flight 285 crashes at New Bedford Airport.
 1962 - Waterfront Historic Area League organized.
 1970
 Club of French Sharpshooters, a French Canadian benevolent and fraternal organization, disbands
 Racial unrest.
 1972
 New Bedford High School established.
 John A. Markey becomes mayor.
 New Bedford Historical Commission established.
 Sister city relationship established with Horta, Azores.
 1976 - New Bedford Fire Museum opens.
 1977 - Greater New Bedford Regional Vocational-Technical High School established.
 1985 - A labor strike breaks out between fishermen and a trade association of shipowners.
 1987 - Sister city relationship established with Tosashimizu, Japan.
 1988-89 - New Bedford Highway Killer active
 1996
 Multi-stage folk festival begins at the State Pier; this event evolves into Summerfest, then New Bedford Folk Festival
 New Bedford Whaling National Historical Park and New Bedford Historical Society  established.
 City website online (approximate date).
 1997
 Azorean Maritime Heritage Society organized.
 New Bedford Bay Sox baseball team formed.

21st century

 2003 - Coast Guard Station New Bedford closes.
 2006 - Scott W. Lang becomes mayor.
 2010
 Population: 95,072.
 New Bedford Museum of Glass opens.
 2012 - Jonathan F. Mitchell becomes mayor.
 2015 - Marine Commerce Terminal begins operating.

See also
 New Bedford history
 List of mayors of New Bedford, Massachusetts
 National Register of Historic Places listings in New Bedford, Massachusetts
 Timelines of other municipalities in the Greater Boston area of Massachusetts: Boston, Cambridge, Haverhill, Lawrence, Lowell, Lynn, Salem, Somerville, Waltham, Worcester

References

Bibliography

 
 
 
  (novelist's description of New Bedford)

External links

 WhalingCity.net. Chronological History of New Bedford, Mass.
 
 Works related to New Bedford, various dates (via Digital Public Library of America).
 Items related to New Bedford, various dates (via US Library of Congress, Prints & Photos division)
 Images related to New Bedford (via New York Public Library)

Images

New Bedford, Massachusetts
new bedford